Frank Benatelli (born 19 August 1962) is a German football coach and a retired player.

Club career
Born and raised in Bochum, Benatelli played in his youth for the local clubs SV Waldesrand Linden and SV Westfalia Weitmar 09. Still during his youth career, he joined local heavyweights VfL Bochum, where he made it into the first team and spent his entire senior career.

He had to retire at the age of only 28 due to an injury of his patellar ligament which resulted in a limited capacity of his knee.

Career statistics

Honours
 DFB-Pokal finalist: 1987–88

Personal life
He is the son of a German mother and an Italian father, Egidio, who hails from Caorle close to Venice. He himself has two children, a daughter, Laura, and a son, Rico, who is also a professional footballer.

References

External links
 

1962 births
Living people
Sportspeople from Bochum
German footballers
Association football midfielders
German people of Italian descent
German football managers
VfL Bochum players
VfL Bochum II players
Bundesliga players
TuRU Düsseldorf managers
Schwarz-Weiß Essen managers
Footballers from North Rhine-Westphalia